Nicholas Peter Senzel (born June 29, 1995) is an American professional baseball outfielder for the Cincinnati Reds of Major League Baseball (MLB).  Prior to playing professionally, Senzel attended the University of Tennessee, where he played college baseball for the Volunteers. The Reds selected him with the second overall selection in the 2016 MLB draft and he made his major league debut in 2019.

Amateur career
Senzel attended Farragut High School in Farragut, Tennessee. Playing for the school's varsity baseball team all four years, he was a starter since his sophomore season. As a junior, he recorded a .404 batting average, seven home runs, and 46 runs batted in (RBIs) while playing second base for the Admirals. Following his junior season, he signed his National Letter of Intent to join the Georgia baseball team. As a senior, he hit .386 with five home runs and 42 RBIs. After Georgia fired coach David Perno, he was granted a release from his letter of intent to the University of Georgia. On June 17, 2013, he committed to the University of Tennessee. Due to his late change to Tennessee, he played his first season in college as a walk-on.

As a freshman at the University of Tennessee in 2014, Senzel had a .315 batting average, a .419 on-base percentage (OBP), and a .420 SLG, with twelve doubles. He played in 53 of 54 games with 45 starts coming at designated hitter (DH) and eight at second base. He was named a freshman All-American by Louisville Slugger and Perfect Game. Following his freshman season at Tennessee, Senzel played collegiate summer baseball for the Mat-Su Miners of the Alaska Baseball League, where he batted 17-for-81 (.210) with three home runs and 13 RBIs.

As a sophomore in 2015, Senzel batted .325 with a .495 SLG, 4 home runs, and 28 RBIs. In the summer of 2015, he played for the Brewster Whitecaps of the Cape Cod Baseball League, and received the league's MVP and Outstanding Pro Prospect awards after hitting .364 with four home runs and 33 RBIs.

In the 2016 season as a junior, Senzel hit 25 doubles to lead the Southeastern Conference. Senzel was nominated for the Golden Spikes Award, which is awarded to the top collegiate player in the nation. He was also named a Perfect Game'''/Rawlings First Team All-American,  a Second Team All-American by Baseball America and Third Team All-America selection by both Louisville Slugger/Collegiate Baseball Newspaper'' and D1Baseball.

Professional career

Draft and minor leagues
Senzel was considered to be one of the best available players in the 2016 Major League Baseball draft, The Philadelphia Phillies, who had the first overall pick, scouted Senzel. Many baseball executives and scouts agreed that Senzel was the safest pick in the draft. He was also rated as the best hitter in the draft because of his abilities to hit gap-to-gap with power.

After the Phillies selected Mickey Moniak with the first overall selection, the Cincinnati Reds chose Senzel with the second overall pick. On June 13, 2016, Senzel signed with the Reds, receiving a $6.2 million signing bonus. Senzel made his professional debut with the Billings Mustangs of the Rookie-level Pioneer League, where he batted .152 with one double.  He was promoted to the Dayton Dragons of the Class A Midwest League on June 30. He hit .329 with seven home runs for Dayton.

Senzel began the 2017 season with the Daytona Tortugas of the Class A-Advanced Florida State League, and was promoted to the Pensacola Blue Wahoos of the Class AA Southern League in June. He posted a combined .321 batting average with 14 home runs, 65 RBIs, and a .905 OPS in 119 games between Daytona and Pensacola.

Senzel began 2018 with the Louisville Bats of the Class AAA International League. On June 23, 2018, it was revealed that Senzel's 2018 season ended after he required surgery to repair a torn ligament on his right index finger. Upon his return from injury, Senzel told new Reds' manager David Bell, that he was preparing to play center field.

The Reds allowed Senzel to play center field in Spring Training with a chance to compete with Scott Schebler for the starting role. He had a .308 with a .300 on-base percentage and a .462 slugging percentage. Despite his performance, the Reds elected to send Senzel to minor league camp. Senzel's agent assumed that the service-time rules in baseball was the majority influence on the team's decision; if Senzel were to play 12 days in the minors before being promoted to the majors, the Reds would receive another year of club control. Just three days later, Senzel sprained his ankle during a minor league game. In eight games with Louisville, Senzel hit one home run and batted .257.

Cincinnati Reds
On May 3, 2019, Senzel was called up to the majors by the Reds. He made his major league debut that day at Great American Ballpark, going 1-for-5 two strikeouts and two walks. Senzel's first hit was a slow-roller to third that he beat out off the San Francisco Giants' Tony Watson. Senzel hit his first major league home run on May 4, off Giants' Dereck Rodríguez. His second and third home runs came two days later at home against the Giants off Drew Pomeranz. Senzel finished the month of May with a .279 batting average, four home runs, 12 RBIs, and 12 walks.

On September 12, 2019, Senzel was placed on the injured list with a torn labrum. In 104 games of his first season in the Majors, Senzel batted .256 with 12 home runs, 20 doubles, and 42 RBIs.

In the following season, Senzel returned to the injured list on August 19 and missed 27 games in August and September for undisclosed reasons. During the pandemic-shortened season, Senzel batted .186/.247/.357 with two home runs and eight RBIs in 23 games.

On June 13, 2021, Senzel was placed on the 60-day injured list with left knee inflammation. On August 15, Senzel was activated from the injured list and optioned to Triple-A Louisville, but days later was returned to the injured list when it was discovered that Senzel's knee was not healthy enough for him to play.

References

External links

Tennessee Volunteers bio

1995 births
Living people
Baseball players from Atlanta
Baseball players from Knoxville, Tennessee
Major League Baseball outfielders
Major League Baseball third basemen
Cincinnati Reds players
Tennessee Volunteers baseball players
Brewster Whitecaps players
Billings Mustangs players
Dayton Dragons players
Daytona Tortugas players
Pensacola Blue Wahoos players
Louisville Bats players
Farragut High School alumni
Mat-Su Miners players